Cai Evans (born 23 June 1999) is a Welsh rugby union player who plays for the Ospreys as a fly-half. He is a Wales under-20 international.

Evans made his debut for the Ospreys in 2017 having previously played for the Ospreys academy, Bridgend Ravens and the Ospreys Development . He made his Challenge Cup debut on 20 October 2018 against Worcester Warriors.

References

External links 
Ospreys Player Profile

1999 births
Living people
Ospreys (rugby union) players
Rugby union players from Penarth
Welsh rugby union players
Rugby union fly-halves